The 2014 U.S. F2000 National Championship was a season of the U.S. F2000 National Championship, an open wheel auto racing series that is the first step in IndyCar's Road to Indy ladder. It was the fifth full season of the series since its revival in 2010. The National Class merged with the Championship class in 2014, resulting in just one class of competition.

Frenchman Florian Latorre, driving for Cape Motorsports with Wayne Taylor Racing, won the championship by winning the final race of the season over Team E's R. C. Enerson. Enerson started the season on a hot streak, winning three of the first four races, before a cold streak ensued. Meanwhile Latorre had a steadily competitive season, only suffering one DNF in the penultimate race when he could have clinched the championship. Enerson won five races and finished on the podium in nine of the fourteen races. Meanwhile Latorre only won three times and only scored eight podium finishes, his comparative lack of poor finishes gave him the championship. Latorre's championship gives him a Mazda Road to Indy scholarship to participate in the Pro Mazda Championship in 2015.

Latorre's team mate Jake Eidson finished third in the championship, ten points back from Enerson in a season where he scored two wins. ArmsUp Motorsports' Aaron Telitz scored a single win and finished in fourth place. Afterburner Autosport's Victor Franzoni of Brazil captured the season opener but struggled thereafter, and ultimately fell to fifth in points. The series' first trip to the Indianapolis Motor Speedway road course resulted in two drivers scoring their first and only wins of the season. Will Owen employed an aggressive tire strategy to win the first race on a drying racetrack after a rainstorm and JAY Motorsports' highly touted rookie Adrian Starrantino won the second race in what was otherwise a lackluster season.

Cape Motorsports with Wayne Taylor Racing captured their third straight teams' championship, mainly in part, to the performances of Latorre and Eidson.

Drivers and teams
All teams were American-registered.

Team changes
2010 and 2011 team champions Andretti Autosport announced that they would not field U.S. F2000 entries in 2014.

Race calendar and results
The series schedule, along with the other Road to Indy series, was announced on October 24, 2013. Unlike previous seasons, all races are in support of the IndyCar Series except the race at Lucas Oil Raceway. All road and street course race weekends are double-headers. The series will race at the Indianapolis Motor Speedway, Barber Motorsports Park, and Sonoma Raceway for the first time in its history. 2014 will be the first season since its revival that will not begin at Sebring Raceway.

Championship standings

Drivers' Championship

Teams' Championship

References

External links
 

U.S. F2000 National Championship seasons
U.S. F2000 National Championship